Graffillidae is a family of flatworms belonging to the order Rhabdocoela.

Genera:
 Breslauilla Reisinger, 1929
 Bresslauilla Reisinger, 1929
 Graffilla Ihering, 1880
 Nygulgus Marcus, 1954
 Paravortex Wahl, 1906
 Pseudograffilla Meixner, 1938

References

Platyhelminthes